Tau Lo Chau is an uninhabited island of Hong Kong, part of the Soko Islands group, located south of Lantau Island.

References

Islands of Hong Kong
Islands District
Uninhabited islands of Hong Kong